Latirolagena smaragdula is a species of sea snail, a marine gastropod mollusk in the family Fasciolariidae, the spindle snails, the tulip snails and their allies.

Description

Distribution
 Aldabra
 Chagos
 Madagascar
 Mascarene Basin
 Red Sea

References

Fasciolariidae
Gastropods described in 1758
Taxa named by Carl Linnaeus

zh:钓锤旋螺